Michael McCorkle "Mac" Jones (born September 5, 1998) is an American football quarterback for the  New England Patriots of the National Football League (NFL). He played college football at Alabama, where he set the NCAA season records for passer rating and completion percentage as a junior en route to winning the 2021 College Football Playoff National Championship. Selected by the Patriots in the first round of the 2021 NFL Draft, Jones led the team to a playoff berth during his rookie season and earned Pro Bowl honors.

Early life and high school
Michael McCorkle Jones was born on September 5, 1998, to Gordon and Holly Jones in Jacksonville, Florida. His father played tennis at Florida State University and Flagler College. Mac's brother, Will, played soccer at Mercer University; his sister Sarah Jane played tennis for the College of Charleston. He worked as a child model and actor making appearances in commercials.

Jones played high school football at The Bolles School in Jacksonville, Florida, under head coach Corky Rogers. During his junior year in 2015, Jones led Bolles to the state regional final. As a senior in 2016, Jones led Bolles to the Florida 4A title, throwing for 1,532 yards and 29 touchdowns.

College career

2017
After originally committing to the University of Kentucky, Jones accepted a scholarship offer from the University of Alabama to play for the Crimson Tide. He arrived as an early enrollee, but was redshirted his freshman season in 2017. Jones was charged with driving under the influence (DUI) and was suspended for the following game against LSU. After throwing for 289 yards and two touchdowns in the Crimson Tide's spring game, he was named A-Day MVP.

2018
In the 2018 season, Jones appeared in 14 of the Crimson Tide's 15 games, mostly as a holder on special teams. He added his name to the Alabama record book with a 94-yard touchdown pass to Jaylen Waddle, the second-longest in school history, in a win against Louisiana.

2019
Jones served as the starting quarterback near the end of the 2019 season after Tua Tagovailoa suffered a severe hip injury. He made four starts for the Crimson Tide, beating Arkansas and Western Carolina before falling to Auburn in the Iron Bowl. Jones threw for 335 yards, four touchdowns, and two interceptions in the 48–45 defeat. Following the Iron Bowl, Jones led Alabama to a 35–16 win over Michigan in the Citrus Bowl. He finished the 2019 season with 1,503 passing yards, 14 touchdowns, and three interceptions in 11 games and four starts.

During his sophomore year, Jones earned a bachelor's degree in communication studies with a 4.00 GPA. After the commencement ceremony, he announced he would return to Alabama as a graduate student.

2020

With Tagovailoa departing for the 2020 NFL Draft, Jones took over as the starting quarterback for Alabama. In a game against the #3 ranked Georgia Bulldogs, he threw for 417 yards and four touchdowns, helping Alabama win 41–24. On October 31, Jones and the Crimson Tide shut out Mississippi State 41–0. Jones threw for 291 yards and four touchdowns, all of which went to DeVonta Smith. In the Iron Bowl against Auburn, Jones threw for 302 yards and five touchdowns. The following week, Jones threw for 385 yards and four touchdowns against LSU. With the win, the Crimson Tide clinched a berth in the 2020 SEC Championship Game against Florida. There, Jones threw for 418 yards and five touchdowns, with Alabama winning 52–46. Alabama went 11–0 in a schedule featuring only in-conference opponents due to the COVID–19 pandemic.

Playoffs 
Alabama was selected to take on Notre Dame in the 2021 Rose Bowl semifinal game, where Jones threw four touchdown passes on route to a 31–14 win. Alabama would go on to win the 2021 College Football Playoff National Championship game against the Ohio State Buckeyes 52–24, with Jones throwing 5 touchdown passes. Jones finished the season throwing for 4,500 yards with 41 touchdowns and four interceptions. His 203.1 passer rating and 77.4 completion percentage were both NCAA season records. He was named the recipient of the Davey O'Brien, Johnny Unitas Golden Arm, and Manning Awards. Jones finished third for the Heisman Trophy, which went to his teammate Smith. Having earned his master's degree in sports hospitality with a 4.00 GPA, Jones also received Academic All-American of the Year honors from the College Sports Information Directors of America in both Division I football and all Division I sports for the 2020–21 school year. Following the season, Jones announced that he would forgo his final year of eligibility and enter the 2021 NFL Draft.

College statistics

Professional career 

One of the top quarterback prospects of the 2021 NFL Draft, Jones was projected to be taken in the first round. Although many analysts predicted he would be selected third overall by the San Francisco 49ers, Jones was selected 15th overall by the New England Patriots after the 49ers drafted North Dakota State quarterback Trey Lance. He was the last of five quarterbacks and the fourth of six Alabama players taken in the first round. Jones was also the first quarterback drafted in the first round by the Patriots since Drew Bledsoe in 1993. He signed his four-year rookie contract, worth $15.6 million fully guaranteed, on July 6, 2021.

2021

Following the preseason, Jones was named the Patriots' starter for 2021. Jones beat out incumbent starting quarterback Cam Newton, who was released during the final roster cuts. He became New England's first rookie quarterback to start a season opener since Bledsoe in 1993.

In his NFL debut, Jones completed 29 of 39 passes for 281 yards and made his first touchdown pass to wide receiver Nelson Agholor in a 17–16 loss against the Miami Dolphins. He also set the NFL completion percentage record for a debuting rookie at 74.4. His first win came the following week over the New York Jets and he became the first rookie quarterback to convert over 70% of 60 passes in his first two starts by obtaining a 73.3 completion rate. Jones struggled during a Week 3 loss to the New Orleans Saints, in which he had three interceptions, including his first to safety P. J. Williams. The following week, Jones made his Sunday Night Football debut against the defending Super Bowl LV champion Tampa Bay Buccaneers and former Patriots quarterback Tom Brady. Although the Patriots lost 19–17, Jones had 19 consecutive completions, the most for an NFL rookie since 1991 and tying the franchise record set by Brady in 2015. Jones had his first fourth quarter comeback and game-winning drive during Week 5 against the Houston Texans when he helped the Patriots rally from a 22–9 deficit to win 25–22. Two weeks later, Jones won his first home game during a 54–13 rout of the Jets, throwing for 307 yards and two touchdowns before backup Brian Hoyer relieved him in the final minutes.

The Week 7 victory began a seven-game winning streak for the Patriots, with Jones completing 69.4% of his passes for 1,397 yards, nine touchdowns, and two interceptions. Jones also became the first NFL rookie quarterback to have a completion percentage over 80 in consecutive games, which he obtained in victories over the Cleveland Browns and Atlanta Falcons. Amid the streak, he was named Offensive Rookie of the Month for November. In the seventh consecutive victory, he attempted only three passes against the Buffalo Bills due to heavy wind conditions, the second-fewest by a winning team since the Bills in 1974. New England's winning streak ended with consecutive losses against the Indianapolis Colts and Bills, which saw Jones record two interceptions in each game. After a Week 17 rout of the Jacksonville Jaguars, Jones became the first Patriots quarterback other than Brady to clinch a postseason berth since 1998. He also threw his 20th touchdown pass, breaking Jim Plunkett's franchise rookie record from 1971.

Jones finished the season with 3,801 passing yards, 22 touchdowns, and a 67.6 completion percentage, which were the highest among rookie quarterbacks in 2021. Additionally, he was the only rookie quarterback to lead a team to a winning record and playoff appearance. Jones became the first Patriots rookie quarterback to start a playoff game with his wild card appearance against the Bills, throwing for 232 yards, two touchdowns, and two interceptions in the 47–17 loss.

For his performance in his first season, Jones was named to the 2021 PFWA All-Rookie Team and finished second in Offensive Rookie of the Year voting behind Ja'Marr Chase. He was also selected as an alternate to the 2022 Pro Bowl, making him the fourth Patriots rookie and the franchise's first rookie quarterback to receive Pro Bowl honors.

2022

With the departure of offensive coordinator Josh McDaniels, Jones began the 2022 season under a new offense called by offensive line coach and former defensive coordinator Matt Patricia. Jones struggled over the first three games, throwing a combined five interceptions to two touchdowns and winning only one of his starts. During a Week 3 defeat against the Baltimore Ravens, in which he threw three interceptions, Jones suffered an ankle injury on his final pass. The injury was diagnosed as an ankle sprain that forced him to miss New England's next three matchups, during which the team went 2–1 under Brian Hoyer and rookie Bailey Zappe.

Jones returned for the Week 7 Monday Night Football matchup with the Chicago Bears, but after going three-and-out on his first two drives and throwing an interception on his third, he was benched for Zappe in the 33–14 defeat. Prior to the game, there was a quarterback controversy between Jones and Zappe on who should be the starting quarterback for the Patriots after Jones had been struggling in the season and Zappe playing well. Despite being benched against the Bears, Jones started the following week's game against the New York Jets, completing 24 of 35 passes for 194 yards, a touchdown, and an interception in the 22–17 victory. He also had an interception returned for a touchdown by cornerback Michael Carter II, but a roughing the passer penalty on defensive end John Franklin-Myers negated the play. In a Week 9 victory over the Indianapolis Colts, he completed 20 of 30 passes for 147 yards and a touchdown, ending a seven-game interception streak. Jones had his strongest performance of the season in the Thanksgiving Day game against the Minnesota Vikings, throwing for a career-high 382 yards and two touchdowns, but the Patriots lost 33–26.

After a 22–18 loss to the Cincinnati Bengals, Jones was fined $13,367 for a low hit on cornerback Eli Apple and $10,609 for an unnecessary roughness penalty.

NFL career statistics

Regular season

Postseason

Personal life 
Since 2019, Jones has been in a relationship with Sophie Scott, whom he met at the University of Alabama.

Jones was nicknamed "the Joker" in college for his habit of laughing with his mouth open and having fun in the locker room with his teammates.

In August 2021, Jones signed an endorsement deal with Nobull, a Boston-based company that makes athletic shoes and apparel.

References

External links

New England Patriots bio
Alabama Crimson Tide bio

1998 births
Living people
Alabama Crimson Tide football players
All-American college football players
American football quarterbacks
New England Patriots players
Players of American football from Jacksonville, Florida